Boise is the capital and most populous city of the U.S. state of Idaho and is the county seat of Ada County. As of the 2020 census, there were 235,684 people residing in the city.

The Boise metropolitan area, also known as the Treasure Valley, includes five counties with a combined population of 749,202, the most populous metropolitan area in Idaho. It contains the state's three largest cities: Boise, Nampa, and Meridian. The Boise–Nampa Metropolitan Statistical Area is the 77th most populous metropolitan statistical area in the United States.

Downtown Boise is the cultural center and home to many small businesses and a number of high-rise buildings. The area has a variety of shops and restaurants. Centrally, 8th Street contains a pedestrian zone with sidewalk cafes and restaurants. The neighborhood has many local restaurants, bars, and boutiques. The area also contains the Basque Block, which showcases Boise's Basque heritage. Downtown Boise's main attractions include the Idaho State Capitol, the classic Egyptian Theatre on the corner of Capitol Boulevard and Main Street, the Boise Art Museum on Capitol in front of Julia Davis Park, and Zoo Boise on the grounds of Julia Davis Park.

History

Etymology

The origin of the name is uncertain. One account credits Capt. B. L. E. Bonneville of the U.S. Army as its source. After trekking for weeks through dry and rough terrain, his exploration party reached an overlook with a view of the Boise River Valley. The place where they stood is called Bonneville Point, located on the Oregon Trail east of the city. According to the story, a French-speaking guide, overwhelmed by the sight of the verdant river, yelled "" ("The woods! The woods!")—and the name stuck.

The name may also derive from earlier mountain men who named the river that flows through the city. In the 1820s, French Canadian fur trappers associated with the British-owned Hudson's Bay Company set trap lines in the vicinity. Set in a high-desert area, the tree-lined valley of the Boise River became a distinct landmark, an oasis dominated by cottonwood trees. This led the French trappers to call the area "" ("the wooded river").

Pronunciation
Most local and longtime residents use the pronunciation  (BOYSS-ee), as given on the city's website.

Prior to establishment

Pre-contact and first interactions between Native Americans and settlers
The area of Boise valley was inhabited by Boise Valley Shoshone and Bannock tribes, a part of the "Snake Country." According to the City of Boise's "History of Boise" report, "they gathered annually in the valley to participate in trading rendezvous with other tribes and catch salmon in the Boise River runs to help sustain them year-round. They spent winters in the valley where the climate was milder and visited the hot springs for bathing and healing. Castle Rock, called Eagle Rock by the tribes, was and remains a sacred site."

Boise Valley Shoshone belonged to the "Yahandeka" (groundhog eaters) grouping. They were among the early mounted Shoshone bands. They traveled over a considerable range by the beginning of the nineteenth century, with their main hunting lands along the lower Boise River and Payette River. When Donald MacKenzie developed the Snake country fur trade after 1818, the most prominent of the Boise Shoshone, Peiem (a Shoshoni rendition of “Big Jim”, their leader's English name), became the most influential leader of the large composite Shoshoni band that white trappers regularly encountered in the Snake Country.

In 1811, Wilson Hunt, employed as an agent in the fur trade under John Jacob Astor, organized and led the greater part of a group of about 60 men on an overland expedition to establish a fur trading outpost at the mouth of the Columbia River. This expedition passed through the Boise valley, and was the first ever time a white American has entered the region. Because of the War of 1812 and the lack of U.S. fur trading posts in the Pacific Northwest, most of the route was not used in the following two decades, and thus Snake Country remained free of settler incursions.

After the conclusion of the war of 1812, up until the 1840s, Oregon, while officially "jointly administered", was solely dominated by the British Hudson's Bay Company (HBC), which had a land connection to the inland of the Canadian Prairies via York Factory Express. Snake Country, including Boise Valley remained independent and relatively free of settler passage and incursion. This was due to two main reasons. Firstly, the general region to the East of the Rockies at the time, was described in the media and literature of Eastern US as the "Great American Desert", an arid unproductive region, unsuitable for habitation. Thus the region of Boise itself was of no interest to settlers. Oregon Country, on the other side of the Rockies, was however a desirable destination for settlers. Nevertheless, the British had an official policy of discouraging American settlers. Thus, settler incursions into Boise Valley along the Oregon Trail remained low, until early 1840s.

They were present in the fort until 1844, handing the fort over to the United States Army afterwards.

Increasing settler incursions
Starting from early 1840s, developments further West, in modern Oregon, meant significant changes to the region of Boise. At this time, HBC and the British started moving their operations further North into British Columbia, while there was a slow and steady rise in number of settlers in Oregon Country, who demanded annexation. These developments eventually cumulated in Oregon Treaty, in which the British gave the region up to the US, thus ending the era of "Joint occupation". This meant that Boise valley and much of Snake Country was claimed as Oregon Territory.

With the discovery of gold in California in 1848 and the passage of Donation Land Claim Act, the settler incursions increased exponentially. The increased settler incursions through Shoshone and Bannock territories, and their increased exploitation of the valley's game and resources on their trip, resulted in an increasing sense of frustration among the Indigenous bands along the entire Oregon Trail. Thus, starting from early 1850s, to deter settler caravans from using the route and trespassing on their lands, Native peoples along the entire length of the trail, from modern Eastern Idaho to modern Central Oregon started staging low intensity attacks against passing caravans.

One such attack, referred to as "Ward Massacre", was in Boise Valley, about 20 Miles to the West of modern Boise. On August 20, 1854, Alexander Ward's five-wagon caravan of 20 emigrants was passing through, when a group of Shoshone and Bannock warriors ambushed the caravan. The goal of the ambush was initially to take away the horses of the caravan. However, shooting of one of the Shoshone warriors with a revolver, resulted in the killing of everyone except for two of Alexander Ward's children by the Shoshone warriors. In response, the United States Army launched the Winnas Expedition, which involved raids on Native encampments for a period of several months during Summer of 1855. In the period between 1846 and 1856, 700 white settlers were killed along the entire length of Oregon Trail due to attacks and raids by Native warriors on their caravans while intruding native land. American military intrusion and retaliation only further angered the native tribes and escalated the conflict, which forced the United States Army to abandon Old Fort Boise. Intensified attacks against passing caravans made travel impossible for settlers except with US Army escort, which started from 1858.

Establishment of the new fort, war, and "Idaho's Trail of Tears"

The decline of the California gold rush prompted white settlers to search for gold elsewhere, including much of Idaho. The 1860 discovery of gold in Nez Perce territory near Pierce, Idaho and the resultant arrival of settlers raised tensions significantly. In September of that year, the Utter Party Massacre happened about 100 miles Southeast of Boise, where 29 out of a group of 44 settlers were either killed or captured in an intense and organized ambush.

The discovery of gold around the Boise valley in 1863, together with ongoing fighting prompted the US Military to establish a new Fort Boise, where Boise is located today. The new location was selected because it was near the intersection of the Oregon Trail with a major road connecting the Boise Basin (Idaho City) and the Owyhee (Silver City) mining areas, both of which were booming. That year, the United States established Idaho Territory, whose boundaries included this region. After a year, with the creation of Montana Territory, Boise was made the territorial capital of a much reduced Idaho in a controversial decision which overturned a district court ruling by a one-vote majority in the territorial supreme court along geographic lines in 1866. There was no treaty and no agreement with any of the native tribes up to this point, and the violent resistance against incursion and settlement onto their territory along the Oregon Trail and at the newly-found gold mines continued unabated. In order to resolve the matter of ownership and sovereignty over land, Caleb Lyon, the second governor of Idaho, negotiated with the Boise Valley Shoshone Tribe, and concluded the "Treaty of Fort Boise" on October 10, 1864. This treaty stipulated that the tribe will give up lands to 30 miles on each side of Boise River, land upon which Boise is located, while allowing an equal right to fishing in the river to both the Shoshone and the settlers. The treaty has not been ratified by the US senate to this date, and the tribe hasn't ever received any treaty payments.

Backlash from the perceived friendliness of Caleb Lyon in his dealing with the tribes led to an escalation of pressure and agitation among the White Settlers in Boise and the print media in the city, in demanding either genocide or removal of the tribes. Settler violence against Boise Valley native tribes increased considerably, with some going as far introducing bounties to murder any native. Idaho Statesman, the daily newspaper of Boise, which started publishing in 1864, reflected many such incitements and demands:

At the same time, native warriors around the valley, under the leadership of Howluck also known as "Bigfoot" among white settlers, among others, waged an escalating and intensified guerrilla campaign of harassment of passerby caravans along the Oregon Trail. The United States Army also escalated and intensified "punitive expeditions" against formations of warriors and against civilian communities as well. This marked the start of the "unofficial" Snake War in 1866. This war lasted until 1868, and is statistically the deadliest of the Indian Wars in the West in terms of casualties. In the end, 1,762 men were counted as the casualties of this war from both sides.

In 1868, Fort Hall Indian Reservation was established in Southeastern Idaho, about 220 miles upstream, according to the terms of Fort Bridger Treaty. The Boise Valley Shoshone and Bannock Tribes were not party to this treaty. Nevertheless, in April 1869, the United States Military embarked on a campaign of "Removal, rounding up of natives in the region including in and around Boise, and expelling them with cavalry escort to Fort Hall Indian Reservation. This period is known among the Shoshone and Bannock people as Idaho's Trail of Tears. The forced march to Fort Hall took one month, and out of 500 natives, only 350 made it. Some of the natives managed to escape, and they ran to either Duck Valley or Fort McDermitt in Nevada.

Incorporation and growth 

Boise's early growth was driven significantly by its role in supplying the nearby gold towns that sprung up in the 1860s northeast and then southwest of the town. Miners sometimes wintered in Boise and a number of early prominent businessmen were miners who settled in town in the years after the gold rush waned. By 1864 substantial agricultural production was underway on easily irrigated lands near the river and three canal companies had been incorporated. Early transportation improvements were largely a result of toll road franchises awarded by the territorial legislature starting in the 1860s. These first ran from Fort Boise to the mining centers in the Boise Basin and east to Rocky Bar and to Rattlesnake Station where they connected to the Oregon Trail.

Territorial census records from a special 1864 enumeration list the population of Boise as 1,658, and an act of December 12, 1864 was the first attempt by the Idaho Territorial Legislature to incorporate the city. This was rejected by voters the following March. Two more unsuccessful attempts were made to organize a city administration by election before the 1866 version of the city charter was approved by voters on January 6, 1868. The growing number of homes and businesses, for which owners wanted proper legal title, may have contributed to the eventual success of incorporation. All of these rejected efforts to incorporate the city came after Boise had been made, with great controversy and strong opposition from northern Idaho interests, the territorial capital in 1864, reflecting the rapid shift of population growth from north to south after the discovery of gold. By 1868 Boise had over 400 permanent buildings with a wide range of commercial services. 1868 also marked the formal beginning of a long advocacy for railroad connections to other Idaho communities and, just as importantly, to other growing cities in the west such as Portland, Oregon. Competing railroad and western state government interests frustrated these efforts for many years.

Designed by Alfred B. Mullett, the U.S. Assay Office at 210 Main Street was built in 1871 and today is a National Historic Landmark. It first began accepting gold and silver for purchase on March 2, 1872, largely eliminating the need to transport ore to the mint in San Francisco. A territorial penitentiary, now known as the Old Idaho State Penitentiary, opened the same month several miles east of town.

Boise began to earn its City of Trees nickname in this period with a popular focus on a range of tree planting projects. Thomas J. Davis planted several thousand fruit trees in 1864 and several other early businessmen either founded nurseries or orchards of their own. In the 1870s tree planting began in earnest in downtown Boise led by prominent hotels as well as businessmen and residents. In 1907 Davis donated 43 acres of his orchard property to the city for use as a park in the name of his wife Julia. 

In 1925, with the construction of Chicago-Portland railway line, Boise Union Pacific Depot was established in the city. This train station served passengers until 1997.

While to this day, Boise is on top of unceded indigenous land, and its legal status has not been determined yet, in the spirit of reconciliation between Boise's residents and the native tribes of Boise Valley, on June 8, 2017, Mayor David Bieter has declared the start of the annual "Return of the Boise Valley People Day". The Mayor's declaration stated that descendants of Boise Valley indigenous peoples will return to the site of "Eagle Rock" on the East End of Boise, a site near the State of Idaho's Old Penitentiary compound and adjacent to the Idaho Botanical Gardens. In 2019, this declaration was followed up by the official renaming of "Quarry View Park" to "Eagle Rock Park" with signage also displaying the native Shoshoni name "Pava Kweena Teppi", and the "Castle Rock Reserve" to "Chief Eagle Eye Reserve" with signage also displaying the native Shoshoni name "Ige Dai Teviwa". This site has spiritual and traditional importance to the natives of Boise valley, and is home to a Native American burial ground.

Geography

Most of the metropolitan area lies on a broad, flat plain, descending to the west. Mountains rise to the northeast, stretching from the far southeastern tip of the Boise city limits to nearby Eagle. These mountains are known to locals as the Boise foothills and are sometimes described as the foothills of the Rocky Mountains.

The city is drained by the Boise River and is considered part of the Treasure Valley.

Neighborhoods and areas
Neighborhoods of Boise include the Bench, the North End, West Boise and Downtown. In January 2014, the Boise Police Department (BPD) partnered with the neighborhood blogging site Nextdoor, the first city in the Northwest and the 137th city in the U.S. to do so. Since the app, which enables the city's police, fire, and parks departments to post to self-selected, highly localized areas, first became available in October 2011, 101 neighborhoods and sections of neighborhoods have joined.

Downtown Boise

Downtown Boise is Boise's cultural center and home to many small businesses as well as a growing number of high-rises. While downtown Boise lacks a major retail/dining focus like Seattle and Portland, the area has a variety of shops and growing option for dining choices. Centrally, 8th Street contains a pedestrian zone with sidewalk cafes and restaurants. The neighborhood has many local restaurants, bars, and boutiques and supports a vibrant nightlife. The area contains the Basque Block, which gives visitors a chance to learn about and enjoy Boise's Basque heritage. Downtown Boise's main attractions include the Idaho State Capitol, the classic Egyptian Theatre on the corner of Capitol Boulevard and Main Street, the Boise Art Museum on Capitol in front of Julia Davis Park, and Zoo Boise on the grounds of Julia Davis Park.

Boise's economy was threatened in the late 1990s by commercial development at locations away from the downtown center, such as Boise Towne Square Mall and at shopping centers near new housing developments.

Cultural events in Downtown Boise include Alive after Five and First Thursday.

Boise State University
To the south of downtown Boise is Boise State University and its surrounding environs. The area is dominated by residential neighborhoods and businesses catering to the student population. The unique blue playing field at the 37,000-seat Albertsons Stadium on the BSU campus, home to the Boise State Broncos football team, is a major city landmark. The campus is also home to the Benjamin Victor Gallery and Studio. Other cultural and sports centers in the area include the Velma V. Morrison Center for the Performing Arts and ExtraMile Arena. Broadway Avenue to the east and south of the BSU campus features many college-themed bars and restaurants.

The North End

The North End, generally defined as the part of Boise north of State Street, contains many of the city's older homes. It is known for its tree-lined drives such as Harrison Boulevard, and for its quiet neighborhoods near the downtown area. Downtown Boise is visible from Camel's Back Park. On 13th Street, Hyde Park is home to restaurants and other businesses. The North End also hosts events such as the annual Hyde Park Street Fair. In 2008, the American Planning Association designated Boise's North End one of 10 Great Neighborhoods.

Boise Highlands

The Boise Highlands is just north of the North End. Its location is generally defined as north of Hill Road and east of Bogus Basin Road. Its neighborhood is mostly filled with homes constructed in the 1970s, as well as a golf course/country club known as Crane Creek.

Southwest Boise
Southwest Boise contains sparsely populated neighborhoods built from the 1960s to the early 1980s. Many include acre-sized plots and the occasional farmhouse and pasture. In the 1980s, growth in the area was stunted to prevent urban sprawl. Since this has been lifted, there has been widespread growth of new homes and neighborhoods. The area lies near Interstate 84, theaters, shopping, the airport, golf and the Boise Bench area.

Northwest Boise
Northwest Boise lies against the Boise Foothills to the north, State Street to the south, the city of Eagle to the west, and downtown Boise to the east. It contains a mix of old and new neighborhoods, including Lakeharbor, which features the private Silver Lake, a reclaimed quarry. Northwest Boise has some pockets of older homes with a similar aesthetic to the North End. Downtown is minutes away, as is Veteran's Memorial Park and easy access to the Boise Greenbelt. Across the river sits the Boise Bench and to the west are the bedroom communities of Eagle, Star, and Middleton.

Warm Springs and East End
Warm Springs is centered on the tree-lined Warm Springs Avenue and contains some of Boise's largest and most expensive homes (many of which were erected by wealthy miners and businessmen around the turn of the 20th century; Victorian styles feature prominently). The area gets its name from the natural hot springs that flow from Boise's fault line and warm many of the area's homes. The Natotorium public swim center is here.

Harris Ranch and Riverland East
The far-east end of Warm Springs was once known as Barber Town, featuring a hotel with hot springs nestled into the foothills. It now has some new residential developments, with easy access to Highway 21, which leads to the south-central Idaho mountains, the Boise River, the Boise Foothills, Idaho Department of Parks and Recreation, and the Idaho Shakespeare Festival.

Southeast Boise

Southeast Boise ranges from Boise State University to Micron Technology between Federal Way and the Boise River. Its oldest neighborhood, Original South Boise, was platted in 1890, and accordingly has variegated housing (assiduously maintained by zoning); it consists of 33 blocks bordered by W Beacon Street, S Boise Avenue, and S Broadway Avenue, and hence is a triangular neighborhood immediately adjoining BSU. The rest of Southeast Boise was developed over the decades, largely by a variety of suburban-style homes.

Columbia Village subdivision and the older Oregon Trail Heights were the first major planned communities in Southeast Boise with an elementary and middle school all within walking distance from all homes. The subdivision is at the intersections of Interstate 84, Idaho 21, and Federal Way (former U.S. Highway), which are all major arteries to get anywhere in Boise. The subdivision, a baseball complex, and swimming pools were developed around the Simplot Sports complex. The fields are built over an old landfill and dump, and the fields and gravel parking lot allow radon gases to escape through the ground. The most recent planned community is the  Bown Crossing, which has easy access to the Boise Greenbelt.

On August 25, 2008, at about 7:00 pm, a fire started near Amity and Holcomb during a major windstorm. It destroyed ten houses and damaged nine. One person died in the fire.

Boise Bench
The Bench, generally bounded by Federal Way to the east, Cole Road to the west and Garden City to the north, sits on an elevation approximately  higher than downtown Boise to its northeast. Orchard Street is a major north–south thoroughfare in the neighborhood. The Bench is so named because of this sudden rise, giving the appearance of a step, or bench. The Bench (or Benches, there are three actual benches in the Boise Valley) was created as an ancient shoreline to the old river channel. The Bench is home to the Boise Union Pacific Depot. Like the North End, the Bench has older residential areas such as the Central Rim, Morris Hill, and Depot Bench neighborhoods. Due south of the Bench is the Boise Airport.

West Boise
West Boise is home to Boise Towne Square Mall, the largest in the state, as well as many restaurants, strip malls, and residential developments ranging from new subdivisions to apartment complexes. The Ada County jail and Hewlett Packard's printing division are also here. It is relatively the flattest section of Boise, with sweeping views of the Boise Front. West Boise also borders the city of Meridian.

Cityscape

Climate

Boise has a semi-arid continental climate (Köppen climate classification BSk), with four distinct seasons. Yet because of the aridity, average diurnal temperature variation exceeds  in the height of summer. Spring and fall are mild. Precipitation is usually infrequent and light, especially so during the summer months. It averages approximately  annually.

Tornadoes are rare in Ada County and the Boise area. Since 1950, only twelve tornadoes have been documented within the county, and four of those were during the same storm on August 3, 2000, which is also the most recent date a tornado was documented in the area. None of the tornadoes have been ranked higher than an F1 on the Fujita scale, and no injuries or fatalities were ever documented.

Demographics

2020 Census 
As of the 2020 census, there were 235,684 people residing in the city. 49.8% of population were female persons, 19.9% of persons were under 18 years of age, and 14.6% of persons were 65 years of age and older.

The city's racial composition was 88% White, 9.0% Hispanic or Latino, 3.1% Asian, 1.6% Black or African American, 0.7% American Indian or Alaska Native, .02% Native Hawaiian or Other Pacific Islander, and 4.3% Two or more races. 82.6% identified as White alone, not Hispanic or Latino.

There were 94,449 households with 2.38 persons per household, and 82.5% of persons lived in the same house as they had the previous year. 10.0% of households used a spoken language other than English at home.

2010 Census
As of the census of 2010, there were 205,671 people, 85,704 households, and 50,647 families residing in the city. The city's racial makeup was 89.0% White, 1.5% African American, 0.7% Native American, 3.2% Asian, 0.2% Pacific Islander, 2.5% from other races, and 3.0% from two or more races. Hispanic or Latino people of any race were 7.1% of the population.

There were 85,704 households, of which 29.6% had children under the age of 18 living with them, 44% were married couples living together, 10% had a woman householder with no husband present, 4.5% had a man householder with no wife present, and 41% were non-families. 31% of all households were made up of individuals, and 8.5% had someone living alone who was 65 years of age or older. The average household size was 2.36 and the average family size was 3.

The median age in the city was 35. 23% of residents were under the age of 18; 11% were between the ages of 18 and 24; 29% were from 25 to 44; 26% were from 45 to 64; and 11% were 65 years of age or older. The city's gender makeup was 49% men and 51% women.

Economy
Boise is the headquarters for several major companies, such as Boise Cascade LLC, Albertsons, J.R. Simplot Company, Lamb Weston, Idaho Pacific Lumber Company, Idaho Timber, WinCo Foods, Bodybuilding.com, and Clearwater Analytics. Other major industries are headquartered in Boise or have large manufacturing facilities present. The state government is one of the city's largest employers.

The area's largest private, locally based, publicly traded employer is Micron Technology. Others include IDACORP, Inc., the parent company of Idaho Power, Idaho Bancorp, Boise, Inc., American Ecology Corp., and PCS Edventures.com Inc.

Technology investment and the high-tech industry have become increasingly important to the city, with businesses including Hewlett Packard, Cradlepoint, Healthwise, Bodybuilding.com, ClickBank, Crutial.com, and MarkMonitor. The call center industry is also a major source of employment. There are over 20 call centers in the city employing more than 7,000 people, including WDSGlobal, Electronic Data Systems, Teleperformance, DirecTV, Taos, and T-Mobile.

Varney Air Lines, founded by Walter Varney in 1926, was formed in Boise, though headquartered at Pasco, Washington due to its more attractive prospects and increased economic support in Washington. The original airmail contract was from Pasco to Elko, Nevada, with stops in Boise in both directions. Varney Air Lines is the original predecessor company of present-day United Airlines, which still serves the city at the newly renovated and upgraded Boise Airport.

Top employers
According to Boise Valley Economic Partnership, the top private employers in the city are:

 Note: this list only includes companies who have given the Idaho Department of Labor permission to release their employment numbers.

Culture

Boise is a regional hub for jazz, theater, and indie music. The Gene Harris Jazz Festival is hosted in Boise each spring. Several theater groups operate in the city, including the Idaho Shakespeare Festival, Boise Little Theatre, Boise Contemporary Theater, and ComedySportz Boise, amongst others. The Treefort Music Fest in late March features emerging bands, as well as many other artistic endeavors, and has perforce "morphed from quirky music festival to consuming community event," and the HomeGrown Theatre is notable for continuing the avant garde satirical tradition of puppetry for millennials. The renovated Egyptian Theatre hosts national and regional music acts, comedians, and special film screenings.

Idaho's ethnic Basque community is one of the largest in the United States, on the order of nearly 7,000 people in 2000, many of whom live in Boise. A large Basque festival known as Jaialdi is held once every five years (next in 2025). Downtown Boise features a vibrant section known as the "Basque Block". Boise's former mayor, David H. Bieter, is of Basque descent. Boise is also a sister region of the Basque communities.

Boise is home to several museums, including the Boise Art Museum, Idaho Historical Museum, the Basque Museum and Cultural Center, Idaho Black History Museum, Boise WaterShed and the Discovery Center of Idaho. On the first Thursday of each month, a gallery stroll known as First Thursday is hosted in the city's core business district by the Downtown Boise Association.

Boise also has a thriving performing arts community. The Boise Philharmonic, now in its 49th season, under the leadership of music director and Conductor Eric Garcia continues to grow musically, and introduces excellent guest artists and composers year after year. The dance community is represented by the resurgent Ballet Idaho under artistic director Peter Anastos, and the nationally known and critically acclaimed Trey McIntyre Project also make their home in Boise. All of these perform at the Velma V. Morrison Center for the Performing Arts, on the Boise State University campus. The Morrison Center also hosts local and national fine arts performances. Rounding out the classical performing arts is Opera Idaho, under the direction of Mark Junkert, which brings grand Opera to various venues throughout the Treasure Valley.

The Boise City Department of Arts and History was created in 2008 with the goal of promoting the arts, culture, and history of the city among its residents and visitors. Since 1978 Boise had a public arts commission like many cities to promote public art and education. The Arts Commission provided expert advice on public art installations to the city and private groups, as well as to develop many educational programs within the city promoting the arts. In 2008 the city and the Arts Commission made the decision to introduce history into the scope of the art commission and rename this new commission the Boise City Department of Arts and History.

The Boise City Department of Arts and History oversees several ongoing projects and programs related to art, culture, and history, and a number of short-term projects at any given time. Ongoing projects include maintenance of a public art collection valued at over $3 million, creation and maintenance of city historical and art walks and tours, maintenance of a city historical research collection, artists in residence, and the Fettuccine Forum.

According to a 2012 study performed by Americans for the Arts, arts, both public and private, in Boise is a forty-eight million dollar per year industry. The same study also cited the arts in and around Boise as a supplier of jobs for about 1600 people and producer of roughly $4.4 million in revenue to state and local government.

The Boise Centre on the Grove is an  convention center that hosts a variety of events, including international, national, and regional conventions, conferences, banquets, and consumer shows. It is in the heart of downtown Boise and borders the Grove Plaza, which hosts many outdoor functions throughout the year including the New Year's Eve celebration, the Idaho Potato Drop hosted by the Idaho New Year's Commission. The Morrison-Knudsen Nature Center, located next to Municipal Park, features a streamwalk with wildlife experiences just east of downtown.

Boise has diverse and vibrant religious communities. The Jewish community is served by two synagogues: the Chabad Jewish Center, and the reform Ahavath Beth Israel Temple (completed 1896, is the nation's oldest continually used temple west of the Mississippi). The Church of Jesus Christ of Latter-day Saints dedicated a temple there in 1984. The Catholic Diocese of Boise includes the entire state and is seated at St. John's Cathedral, completed in 1921. The Boise Hare Krishna Temple opened in August 1999, and the Vietnamese Linh Tuu-temple opened in 2016.

Boise (along with Valley and Boise Counties) hosted the 2009 Special Olympics World Winter Games. More than 2,500 athletes from over 85 countries participated.

In 1972, John Waters set the final scene of his film Pink Flamingos in Boise.

Boise's sister city is Gernika, Spain.

Major attractions

Boise offers numerous recreational opportunities, including extensive hiking and biking in the foothills to the immediate north of downtown. Much of this trail network is part of Hull's Gulch and can be accessed by 8th street. An extensive urban trail system called the Boise River Greenbelt runs along the river and through Pierce Park. The Boise River is a common destination for fishing, swimming and rafting.

In Julia Davis Park is Zoo Boise, which has over 200 animals representing over 80 species from around the world. An Africa exhibit, completed in 2008, is the most recent addition. Boise is also home to the Idaho Aquarium.

The Bogus Basin ski area opened in 1942 and hosts multiple winter activities, primarily alpine skiing and snowboarding, but also cross-country skiing and snow tubing.

Boise is the site of the only human rights memorial in the U.S., the Anne Frank Human Rights Memorial, located next to its main library.

The World Center for Birds of Prey, just outside city, is a key part of the re-establishment of the peregrine falcon and its subsequent removal from the endangered species list. The center is breeding the rare California condor, among many other rare and endangered species.

Publications such as Forbes, Fortune and Sunset have cited the city for its quality of life. An article published by Forbes in 2018 named Boise the fastest-growing city in America. Its population of around 220,000 grew 3.08% in 2017, as well as employment by 30.58%.

The cornerstone mall in Boise, Boise Towne Square Mall, is also a major shopping attraction for Boise, Nampa, Caldwell, and surrounding areas. The mall received upgrades and added several new retailers in 1998 and 2006. Home prices, a proxy for wealth, increased 11.58%--number four in the U.S.

The state's largest giant sequoia can be found near St. Luke's Hospital.

Sports

Professional sports teams in Boise include the Boise Hawks of the independent baseball Pioneer League, the Idaho Steelheads of the ECHL (minor league hockey). The Treasure Valley Spartans (semi-pro football) of the (Rocky Mountain Football League) operated from 2009 to 2012. An arenafootball2 franchise, the Boise Burn, began play in 2007 but is now defunct.

Boise is home to an all-female, DIY, flat track roller derby league, the Treasure Valley Rollergirls, which beginning on Labor Day Weekend 2010 hosted an international, two-day, double elimination tournament, the first Spudtown Knockdown, featuring eight teams from throughout the American West and Canada.

The Boise State University campus is home to Albertsons Stadium, a 36,800-seat outdoor football stadium known for its blue playing surface, currently FieldTurf, and ExtraMile Arena, a 12,000-seat basketball and entertainment venue which opened in 1982 as the BSU Pavilion. Boise State University is known primarily for the recent successes of its football team.

The Famous Idaho Potato Bowl football game (formerly known as the Humanitarian Bowl and the MPC Computers Bowl) is held in late December each year, and pairs a team from the Mountain West Conference with a Mid-American Conference team.

Policing and crime
In 1864, John Ward became the first law enforcement Marshal in the newly formed city of Boise. The Boise Police Department was inaugurated in 1903; at the time it consisted of a chief of police, a police sergeant, and seven police officers. Today the Boise City Police Department (BPD) employs just over 400 people, with 325 allocated positions for sworn officers and 82 civilians.

For 2020, Boise Police reported 4 incidents of murder, 147 incidents of rapes, 210 incidents of sexual assault, 56 incidents of robberies, 380 incidents of aggravated assault, 1465 incidents of assault/battery, 479 incidents of burglary, 3164 incidents of theft, 292 incidents of motor vehicle theft, and 35 incidents of robbery. Total crimes have decreased overall between 2016 and 2020. Over the same time, incidents of rape and sexual assault have trended upwards while assault/battery, burglary, theft, and vandalism have trended downwards.

Violent crimes dropped from 775 incidents in 2006 to 586 in 2007, but murders increased from 2004 to 2007. In 2007, there were 3,211 crimes per 100,000 residents. Despite population growth, violent crime has remained much the same as of 2013, with 600 incidents of violent crime in that year.

Education
The Boise School District includes 31 elementary schools, eight junior high schools, five high schools, and two specialty schools. Part of the West Ada School District is within the Boise city limits, and the city is therefore home to six public high schools: Boise, Borah, Capital, Timberline, the alternative Frank Church, and the West Ada School district's Centennial. Boise's private schools include the Catholic Bishop Kelly, Foothills School of Arts and Sciences, the International Baccalaureate-accredited Riverstone International School, and the only student-led school in the country One Stone.

Post-secondary educational options in Boise include Boise State University (BSU) and a wide range of technical schools. The University of Idaho (UI) and Idaho State University (ISU) each maintain a satellite campus in Boise. As of 2014, the city has two law school programs. The Concordia University School of Law opened in 2012, and the University of Idaho College of Law now hosts second and third year students at its Boise campus. Boise is home to Boise Bible College, an undergraduate degree-granting college that exists to train leaders for churches as well as missionaries for the world.

Boiseko Ikastola is the only Basque preschool outside of the Basque Country.

Media

The greater Boise area is served by two daily newspapers, The Idaho Statesman and the Idaho Press-Tribune; a free alternative newsweekly, Boise Weekly; a weekly business news publication, Idaho Business Review, and a quarterly lifestyle magazine, Boise Magazine. In addition to numerous radio stations, Boise has five major commercial television stations that serve the greater Boise area. There are four major news outlets, KTVB (NBC), KBOI-TV (CBS), KIVI-TV (ABC; sister Fox station KNIN-TV airs additional KIVI newscasts), and Idaho Public Television.

Transportation
The major Interstate serving Boise is I-84, which connects Boise with Portland, Oregon, and Salt Lake City, Utah. In addition, residents in the Boise area are served with Interstate 184 (locally known as "The Connector"), a nearly  stretch of freeway connecting I-84 with the downtown Boise area. Highway 55 branches outward northeast. There is a network of bike paths, such as the Boise River Greenbelt, throughout the city and surrounding region. Among US cities, Boise has the seventh highest amount of bicycle commuters per capita with 3.9% of commuters riding to work.

Public transportation includes a series of bus lines operated by ValleyRide.The construction of the underground public transportation hub (UPT Hub) in Boise in the parking lot site near the intersection of W Main Street and N 8th Street was completed in 2016.

Commercial air service is provided at the Boise Airport. The terminal was recently renovated to accommodate the growing number of passengers flying in and out of Boise. It is served by Allegiant Air, Alaska Airlines, American Airlines, Delta Air Lines, Frontier Airlines, Southwest Airlines, and United Airlines. The airport's east end is home to the National Interagency Fire Center. The Gowen Field Air National Guard Base occupies the south side of the field.

The Seattle–Chicago Amtrak Pioneer passenger train stopped at Boise Union Pacific Depot from June 7, 1977, until May 10, 1997, when it was discontinued. A short line railroad (Boise Valley Railroad) serves industries in Boise, connecting with the Union Pacific Railroad in Nampa.

International relations

Twin towns - sister cities 

  Guernica, Basque Country, Spain

Notable people

See also
 
 
 List of parks in Boise
 USS Boise, 2 ships

Notes

References

Further reading

  Available online through the Washington State Library's Classics in Washington History collection Elma MacGibbons reminiscences of her travels in the United States starting in 1898, which were mainly in Oregon and Washington. Includes chapter "Boise, the capital of Idaho".
 Roger Weston: The Recruiter. Novel with sequences in Boise and Sun Valley Idaho.

External links

 
 Boise Convention and Visitors Bureau
 Boise Area Chamber of Commerce

 
Basque-American history
Boise metropolitan area
Cities in Idaho
County seats in Idaho
Populated places established in 1863
Cities in Ada County, Idaho
1863 establishments in Idaho Territory